Khalid Yahya Blankinship (born 1949 in Seattle, Washington) is an American historian who specialises in Islamic and Middle Eastern studies.

Biography
He graduated (BA) in History from the University of Washington in 1973 and in the same year, while still in Seattle, converted to Islam.
 
In 1975 Blankinship received an MA in teaching English as a foreign language from the American University in Cairo, in 1983 a second MA in Islamic History from Cairo University and in 1988 a Ph.D. in History from the University of Washington. He was an advisor for the PBS-broadcast documentary Muhammad: Legacy of a Prophet (2002), produced by Unity Productions Foundation.

He has lived and traveled widely in the Middle East, including time in Egypt and Mecca, Saudi Arabia.  He is currently a tenured professor of religion at Temple University.

Bibliography

 
 
 
 The Inimitable Qurʾān: Some Problems in English Translations of the Qurʾān with Reference to Rhetorical Features. Brill, 2019. 
 Murshid al-Qârî': A Reader’s Guide To Classical Muslim Religious Literature In English. Berkeley, CA: Lamppost Educational Initiative, 2021.

References

The American University in Cairo alumni
University of Washington College of Arts and Sciences alumni
Cairo University alumni
Converts to Islam
Temple University faculty
1949 births
Living people
21st-century American historians
21st-century American male writers
American male non-fiction writers